is  the former Head coach of the Toyama Grouses in the Japanese Bj League.

Head coaching record

|- 
| style="text-align:left;"|Toyama Grouses
| style="text-align:left;"|2011
| 18||5||13||||7th in Eastern |||2||0||2||
| style="text-align:center;"|Lost in 1st round

|- 
| style="text-align:left;"|Toyama Grouses
| style="text-align:left;"|2011-12
| 52||25||27||||5th in Eastern |||2||0||2||
| style="text-align:center;"|Lost in 1st round

|- 
| style="text-align:left;"|Saitama Broncos
| style="text-align:left;"|2014-15
| 52||6||46||||11th in Eastern |||-||-||-||
| style="text-align:center;"|-

|-

References

1976 births
Living people

Japanese basketball coaches
Japan national basketball team coaches
Niigata Albirex BB coaches
San-en NeoPhoenix coaches
San-en NeoPhoenix players
Saitama Broncos coaches

Toyama Grouses coaches